Jan Malcolm is the health commissioner of Minnesota, which has over 1,500 employees and a budget of over $600 million. She was appointed as the commissioner for the Minnesota Department of Health by previous governor Mark Dayton in 2018.

Commissioner of Health for Minnesota 
Jan Malcolm has served under three separate governors of Minnesota. She is currently leading the Department of Health of Minnesota. She was appointed by Mark Dayton after her predecessor, Ed Ehlinger, resigned. She was originally brought on to help with complaints about elder abuse, which she was able to solve after eight months. Since the COVID-19 Pandemic began she has started facing backlash from the Republican party.  As the COVID-19 Pandemic continues, the threat of Republicans outing Malcolm has increased.  Many Republicans are not happy with the way she has been running the COVID-19 relief.

Personal life 
She attended high school at Minnetonka High School and went to Dartmouth College for pre-med. She was married to Kris Carlton, who died in 2019. In June 2021, Malcolm was awarded the Lavender Community Pride Award for LGBTQ Individual.

Career 

Health Department at Ventura

Adjunct Professor at the University of Minnesota at the School of Public Health

CEO of Courage Center

Vice President of Public Affairs and Philanthropy at Allina Health

Notable works 
Leading Public Health: A Competency Framework

References 

State cabinet secretaries of Minnesota
State health commissioners of the United States
Living people
Year of birth missing (living people)
Wikipedia Student Program